The women's 48 kilograms event at the 2014 World Weightlifting Championships was held on 8 and 9 November 2014 in Baluan Sholak Sports Palace, Almaty, kazakhstan.

Schedule

Medalists

Records

 Nurcan Taylan's world record was rescinded in 2021.

Results

References

External links
Results 

2014 World Weightlifting Championships
World